Jeon Woo-chi: The Taoist Wizard (also known as Woochi: The Demon Slayer, is a 2009 South Korean fantasy action film written and directed by Choi Dong-hoon who departs from his popular heist films Tazza: The High Rollers and The Big Swindle for this big-budget, special effects-filled action romp that was equally popular with the Korean audience, earning over six million admissions over the 2009 Christmas period. Based on a Korean folktale, it stars Gang Dong-won in the title role. The film became the 3rd best selling film of 2009 in Korea, with 6,100,532 tickets sold nationwide.

Plot
500 years ago in the Joseon Dynasty, the Flute of the prophecy has fallen into the evil hands of the goblins, propelling the world into a whirlwind of disorder. The ancient Taoist wizards turn to the greatest ascetics of their time, the Master (Baek Yoon-sik) and Hwadam (Kim Yoon-seok) for help in vanquishing the goblins and trust each wizard with one half of the Flute. Meanwhile, the Master's rascal student Jeon Woochi (Gang Dong-won) tricks the king with the art of transformation and creates a fiasco, which makes the three Taoist wizards and Hwadam visit the Master. But they find the Master murdered and his half of the Flute missing. Woochi is framed for the murder, and as punishment he and his trusty dog Chorangyi (Yoo Hae-jin) are imprisoned inside a scroll by the wizards.

Seoul, 2009. For some strange reason, goblins that had been sealed up in the past begin to appear one by one, wreaking havoc on the city. The three Taoist wizards had been enjoying their years of retirement as a priest, a monk, and a shaman, while Hwadam has long disappeared in order to polish his Taoist art. After much discussion, the three wizards unseal the scroll and call forth Jeon Woochi and Chorangyi. Being offered freedom in return for catching the goblins, Woochi sets out on his task. But what began as a hunt for goblins slowly turns into Woochi's personal sightseeing expedition of the modern-day world. And to top it off, he meets a woman with the same face as the one that had captivated him so many centuries ago (Im Soo-jung). Together with Seo In-kyung (his new, yet old love), Woochi begins his adventure.

Unbeknownst to anyone, Hwadam has been secretly releasing the goblins to distract the Taoist wizards away for his own personal motive. Having taken the Flute for himself, Hwadam intends to release the Arch God who has been imprisoned in a human body. He discovers In-kyung whom he suspects is the Arch God. After failing to make it in the acting business partially due to her innocent and cute looks, Hwadam uses his powers and changes her into a self-assured and savvy actress. The director having been frustrated with his chosen actress' behavior, takes notice of In-kyung and has her cast as his new leading lady. Both Woochi and Chorangyi discovers Hwadam's true motive in murdering the Master in order to steal the flute for himself.

Soon the truth comes out when Chorangyi reveals to the three Taoist wizards that Hwadam played them for fools and had murdered the Master in order to take the Flute for himself. Confronting him, the wizards realizes that they had wrongfully imprisoned Woochi and tricks Hwadam into believing they're giving up the flute. Woochi takes the flute and it leads to a battle between him and Hwadan. The Flute is destroyed, but Hwadam makes his final stand. He is stopped by In-kyung using the Arch God's powers and making the Taoist wizards realize that she was the Arch God herself. Hwadam is sealed away in the scroll for his crimes in murdering the master. Woochi reveals to Chorangyi, much to his terror, that he was a female dog.

The movie with In-kyung in the lead is successful, which the director is glad to have made the change in actresses. However, the original actress for the role shows up to give the director and everyone else an earful of her tirades. Woochi uses his powers to trick her with the art of transformation and helps In-kyung and himself escape to a beach in Batangas.

Cast
Gang Dong-won as Jeon Woo-chi
Kim Yoon-seok ... Hwa-dam
Im Soo-jung ... Seo In-kyung 
Yoo Hae-jin ... Cho Raeng-yi
Kim Sang-ho ... Priest
Joo Jin-mo ... Shaman
Song Young-chang ... Buddhist monk
Baek Yoon-sik ... Master Wizard
Yum Jung-ah ... Actress
Gong Jung-hwan ... Goblin
Sunwoo Sun ... Goblin
Shin Cheol-jin ... Homeless person	
Park Soo-young ... Nobleman's son	
Kim Hyo-jin ... Red hair
 Go Jun ... Person at inn 3

Home media
Shout! Factory released the film on Blu-ray Disc and DVD on April 9, 2013.

Spin-off series

The television series Jeon Woo-chi starring Cha Tae-hyun in the titular role and Uee as his love interest was broadcast on KBS2 in 2012. Though based on the same fantasy folktale, its plot and set of characters are different from the film.

References

External links 
  
 
 
 

2009 films
2000s action comedy films
2000s fantasy comedy films
South Korean fantasy comedy films
South Korean action comedy films
Films set in the Joseon dynasty
Films set in 2009
Films set in Seoul
Films based on Korean myths and legends
Films directed by Choi Dong-hoon
CJ Entertainment films
2000s Korean-language films
2009 comedy films
2000s South Korean films